Me & My Piano is a 2001 album by Krystal.

Me and My Piano may also refer to:
Me and My Piano, series of piano teaching materials by Fanny Waterman and Marion Harewood   
Me and My piano, album by Einar Iversen 1967

See also
My Piano and I, BBC radio series by Clive Lythgoe
Just Me and My Piano, album by Floyd Cramer 1989